Hervé Pellois (born 17 April 1951) is a French politician representing La République En Marche! (LREM) and Territories of Progress (TDP). He was elected to the French National Assembly on 20 June 2012 as a miscellaneous left candidate, representing the department of Morbihan.

See also
 2017 French legislative election

References

1951 births
Living people
People from Côtes-d'Armor
Socialist Party (France) politicians
La République En Marche! politicians
Territories of Progress politicians
Deputies of the 14th National Assembly of the French Fifth Republic
Deputies of the 15th National Assembly of the French Fifth Republic